The Cairo and Vincennes Railroad was a 19th-century American railroad that connected Cairo, Illinois, with Vincennes, Indiana. It was chartered by the state of Illinois in 1867 through the efforts of former American Civil War General Green B. Raum, who subsequently oversaw the planning and engineering of the proposed line. Within a few years, the fledgling railroad company named another former general, Ambrose Burnside, as its president. The Cairo & Vincennes began laying track in 1870 and completed the initial portion in 1872 to haul coal from southern Illinois mines. However, the route was not fully completed until late in 1874.

In January 1874, the railroad was teetering on bankruptcy and the contractors, the firm of Winslow & Wilson, applied for control. In February, a new board of directors assumed control of the railroad and named industrialist J. P. Morgan as the new president, replacing Burnside. In April, the C&V formally went into receivership. The next month, receivers H. L. Morrill and A. B. Salford took possession of the Cairo and Vincennes Railroad.

The line was reorganized into the Cairo and Vincennes Railway in 1880, which in turn became part of the Wabash, St. Louis and Pacific Railway in 1881, but was resold to the Cairo, Vincennes and Chicago Railway at the Wabash's foreclosure in 1889. The CV&C became part of the Cleveland, Cincinnati, Chicago and St. Louis Railway (Big Four) system, which itself became part of the New York Central Railroad system in 1906. With the exception of a small portion in Carmi, the entire line has been abandoned, though the right of way, with numerous concrete bridges, remains mostly intact. The bridge over the Wabash River also remains, now operated as a toll bridge by the town of St. Francisville for automobile traffic.  Part, in Illinois, has been rededicated as the Tunnel Hill State Trail.

Cities on the line
Vincennes, Indiana
St. Francisville, Illinois
Allendale, Illinois
Mt. Carmel, Illinois
Grayville, Illinois
Carmi, Illinois
Norris City, Illinois
Eldorado, Illinois
Muddy, Illinois
Harrisburg, Illinois
Ledford, Illinois
Carrier Mills, Illinois
Stonefort, Illinois
New Burnside, Illinois
Parker City, Illinois
Tunnel Hill, Illinois
Vienna, Illinois
Forman, Illinois
Mound City, Illinois
Cairo, Illinois

References

Cairo, Illinois
Knox County, Indiana
Companies affiliated with the Cleveland, Cincinnati, Chicago and St. Louis Railway
Defunct Illinois railroads
Defunct Indiana railroads
Predecessors of the New York Central Railroad
Ambrose Burnside
Railway companies established in 1867
Railway companies disestablished in 1880
American companies disestablished in 1880
American companies established in 1867